Ismaël Sindou Kamagate (born 17 January 2001) is a French professional basketball player for the Paris Basketball of the LNB Pro A with his draft rights retained by the Denver Nuggets of the National Basketball Association (NBA).

Early life and career
Kamagate was born in the 19th arrondissement of Paris to Ivorian parents. He grew up playing football as a goalkeeper, which he did not enjoy, before being introduced to basketball by age 11 at the Jeunesse Athlétique de Montrouge. At age 12, Kamagate began playing basketball for a local youth club Basket Paris 14 and he moved to Paris-Levallois three years later. In 2017, he started a two-season stint with Orléans Loiret, competing for the club's under-18 and second teams.

Professional career
On 27 July 2019, Kamagate signed with Paris Basketball of the LNB Pro B. In his first season with the club, he split playing time between the Pro B and with Centre Fédéral de Basket-ball in the Nationale Masculine 1. In the 2021–22 season, his team was promoted to the LNB Pro A and he assumed a greater role. On 9 October 2021, Kamagate posted 18 points, nine blocks and five rebounds in a 98–97 loss to Chorale Roanne. He became the fifth player in league history with at least nine blocks in a game and was one short of Derrick Lewis' record (10). Kamagate was selected to play in the LNB All-Star Game, where he was the youngest player. He was named LNB Pro A Best Defender for the season. On 22 April 2022, Kamagate declared for the 2022 NBA draft, where analysts considered him a possible first-round pick.

On June 23, 2022, Kamagate was selected by the Detroit Pistons with the 46th pick. He was then traded to the Portland Trail Blazers and then to the Denver Nuggets.

On August 16, 2022, Kamagate, along with other Frenchman draftee Juhann Begarin returned for another year with the Paris Basketball.

National team career
Kamagate represented France at the 2019 FIBA U18 European Championship in Greece, where he averaged 4.6 points and 3.9 rebounds per game. At the 2021 FIBA U20 European Challengers, he averaged 10.2 points, 3.8 rebounds, and 2.4 blocks per game.

References

External links

LNB profile

2001 births
Living people
Basketball players from Paris
Centers (basketball)
Detroit Pistons draft picks
French men's basketball players
French sportspeople of Ivorian descent
Paris Basketball players